The tallest building in the world, as of , is the Burj Khalifa. The title of "world's tallest building" has been borne by various buildings, such as the Lincoln Cathedral, the Empire State Building and the original World Trade Center.

Before the modern skyscraper era, between  1311 and 1884, the tallest buildings and structures were mostly Christian churches and cathedrals. Before the 13th century, the tallest buildings in the world cannot be conclusively determined. For thousands of years, the Great Pyramid in Egypt was the tallest structure in the world until Lincoln Cathedral of 1311, but the Great Pyramid is not considered a building since it is not habitable. Similarly, the Eiffel Tower was the world's tallest structure from 1889, when it was built, but not the tallest building.

The skyscraper was invented in Chicago in 1884 when the Home Insurance Building was constructed using a steel frame with curtain walls instead of load-bearing walls. For the next hundred years, the world's tallest building was always in the United States, with New York City accumulating 86 years, and Chicago 30 years. After just over a century (1885–1998), the distinction moved to the Eastern Hemisphere. Malaysia was the first country to break the United States' record of constructing the tallest buildings in the world when the Petronas Towers were completed in 1998. Taiwan's Taipei 101 was the next to hold the record; the building's status as the world's tallest lasted from 2004 to 2009, when it was transferred to the Burj Khalifa, the current record-holder of 828 meters tall, upon its completion in the United Arab Emirates.

Definition of terms

Meaning of "building"
From then until the completion of the Washington Monument (capped in 1884) the world's tallest structures were churches or cathedrals. Later, the Eiffel Tower and, still later, some radio masts and television towers, were the world's tallest structures.

However, though all of these are structures, some are not buildings in the sense of being regularly inhabited or occupied. It is in this sense of being regularly inhabited or occupied that the term "building" is generally applied when determining the world's tallest building. The non-profit international organization Council on Tall Buildings and Urban Habitat (CTBUH), which maintains a set of criteria for determining the height of tall buildings, defines a "building" as "(A) structure that is designed for residential, business or manufacturing purposes" and that "has floors".

Tall churches and cathedrals occupy a middle ground: their lower areas are regularly occupied, but much of their height is in bell towers and spires which are not. Whether a church or cathedral is a "building" or merely a "structure" for the purposes of determining the title of "world's tallest building" is a subjective matter of definition (this article treats churches and cathedrals as buildings).

Determination of height
The Council on Tall Buildings and Urban Habitat uses three different criteria for determining the height of a tall building, each of which may give a different result. "Height of the highest floor" is one criterion, and "height to the top of any part of the building" is another, but the default criterion used by the CTBUH is "height of the architectural top of the building", which includes spires but not antennae, masts or flag poles.

Before the 20th century

Before the 13th century
 
Early tall buildings were similar to the record-setting Egyptian pyramid structures. In 1400 BC the  ziggurat of Dur-Kurigalzu was constructed in Iraq, and in 601 BC the Etemenanki ziggurat of Babylon followed. The  La Danta of El Mirador (Guatemala) and the  Amaravati Stupa of Amaravati (India) were constructed in around 300 BC.

The Chinese explorer Xuanzhang described it as the tallest building in the world in his book Records of the western Region. The Sri Lankan Jetavanaramaya stupa, constructed in the 3rd century, measured  from its construction until the 11th century.

Hwangnyongsa, or Hwangnyong Temple (also spelled Hwangryongsa), is a former Buddhist temple in the city of Gyeongju, South Korea. Completed in the 7th century, the enormous nine-storey structure was built entirely of interlocking timbers with no iron nails. It was destroyed by invading Mongol forces in 1238.

In the 8th century, two seven-storied pagodas with a height of 100 m(330 ft) were constructed at Todaiｰji (東大寺) in Nara, Japan. They were one of the tallest wooden buildings in the world at the time. By the 14th century, both were burned down by fires caused by war or lightning strikes.

In 1057 the  wooden Shwesandaw Pagoda of Bagan, Myanmar, was constructed.

The entire complex is built of granite.
The  minaret of Koutoubia Mosque in Marrakesh, Morocco, includes a spire and orbs.  It was completed under the reign of the Berber Almohad Caliph Yaqub al-Mansur around 1195.

Churches and cathedrals: tallest buildings between the 13th and 20th century

The world's tallest structures were churches or cathedrals from the 13th/14th century until 1884, and buildings until the beginning of the 20th century. The Old St Paul's Cathedral in London and Lincoln Cathedral both surpassed not only any older tallest building, but also the tallest structures until then, the Pyramids. They were constructed from the 12th century, reaching completion and their maximum height in the 1310s (1314 and 1311 respectively). Lincoln Cathedral's spire collapsed in 1549, and its previous height was not surpassed elsewhere for a long time. St. Mary's Church in Stralsund became the world's tallest building after the collapse of the Lincoln spire. The  central tower of St. Pierre's Cathedral in Beauvais was tallest from 1569 until it collapsed in 1573, making St. Mary's the tallest once again. In 1647, the bell tower of St. Mary's burned down, making the shorter Strasbourg Cathedral the world's tallest building.

It was not until the completion of the Ulm Minster in 1890 that the world's tallest building was again also the tallest building ever constructed, surpassing the original configuration of Lincoln Cathedral.

The  height of Lincoln Cathedral is disputed by some, but accepted by most sources.<ref>{{cite book |last=Haughton |first=Brian |date=2007 |title=Hidden History: Lost Civilizations, Secret Knowledge, and Ancient Mysteries |page=167}}</ref> The completion date for the spire is given as 1311 rather than 1300 by some sources.

Fin de siècle

Among all structures, in 1884 the  Washington Monument had already overtaken the long-standing record held by churches.

Tallest structures since the 20th century

Since the completion of the Washington Monument in 1884, the world's tallest structure has generally not also been the world's tallest building. The exception is 1930–1954, when the Eiffel Tower was surpassed by the Chrysler Building in 1930, and in 1931 the Chrysler Building by the Empire State Building, only to be surpassed in turn by a succession of broadcast masts, starting with the Griffin Television Tower in Oklahoma. The CN Tower in Toronto, Canada held the record for the world's tallest free-standing structure for 32 years, from 1975 until 2007, when it was surpassed by the Burj Khalifa, and was the world's tallest tower until 2009 when it was surpassed by the Canton Tower.

Since the completion of the Burj Khalifa in 2010 it is the tallest building, however, it is not the tallest structure. In 2009, Guinness World Records recognised the underwater Magnolia oil platform as the tallest structure, at a staggering 1,432m (4,698ft).

Skyscrapers: tallest buildings since 1908

High-rise blocks and early skyscrapers

Buildings that have been specifically called the first skyscrapers include:

 Lancashire Insurance Building, 10 floors, built in 1890

Later record-setting early skyscrapers include:
 New York World Building, 1890
 Manhattan Life Insurance Building, 1894

 The height of skyscrapers 

The Chrysler Building was the first building in the world to break the  barrier, and the Empire State Building was the first building to have more than 100 floors. The next tallest skyscraper was the World Trade Center, which was completed in 1971.

It is  taller than the previous record-holders, the Petronas Towers. It has broken several skyscraper records, and it is almost twice as tall as the Empire State Building. Burj Khalifa, however has not broken the record of world's tallest structure. In 2009, Guinness World Records recognised the Magnolia oil platform as the tallest structure. It has a record-breaking height of 1,432 metres (4,698 feet). This would still make it the tallest building in the world but only by 2 meters over the Shanghai Tower, a substantially smaller margin than before.

NOTE: The CTBUH defines a building as a megatall'' if it is 600 m (1970 ft) or taller.

Supertall and Megatall skyscrapers by location 
Since the early skyscraper boom that took place in North America, the significant number of skyscrapers in North America dominated the 100 tallest buildings in the world. In 1930, 99 of the 100 tallest buildings in the world were in North America. In the future, this percentage is expected to decline to only 22 percent. The predominance of skyscrapers in North America is decreasing because of skyscraper construction in other parts of the world, especially in Asia. In Asia, there has been an increase in the number of supertall skyscrapers beginning with the completion of the  Bank of China Tower in Hong Kong in 1990. Currently, sixty of the world's 100 tallest buildings are in Asia (including the Middle East), while all six megatall skyscrapers reside in Asia. All proposed future megatall skyscrapers are also in Asia with the exception of the Lakhta Center 2 in St. Petersburg.

The usage of skyscrapers 
Since the skyscraper era began, the great majority of skyscrapers were used predominantly as office space. From 1930 to 2000, the percentage of office towers never fell below 86 percent, but in the future it is expected to be as low as 46 percent. By 2010, fewer than half of the 100 tallest buildings in the world were office towers, the majority being for residential and mixed use. Only four of the ten tallest buildings in the world, and twenty-eight of the top fifty, were used primarily as offices.

A mixed-use tall building is defined as having two or more functions that occupy a significant proportion of the tower's total space. Support areas such as car parks and mechanical plant space do not contribute towards mixed-use status.

Skyscrapers used primarily or exclusively as hotels or residential space are generally shorter than office and mixed-use buildings, with only a few supertall buildings of the residential or hotel types among the 100 tallest skyscrapers. The tallest completed residential buildings (minimum 85% residential) are Central Park Tower, 111 West 57th Street, and 432 Park Avenue, all on Billionaire's Row in New York City. The tallest completed hotels (primarily hotel space) are the Gevora Hotel, the JW Marriott Marquis Dubai twin towers, the Rose Tower, and the Burj Al Arab, all in Dubai.

List of historically tallest skyscrapers

The following list of tallest buildings is based on the default metric of CTBUH, that of measuring to the highest architectural element. Other criteria would generate a different list. Shanghai World Financial Center is not on the above list, but it surpassed Taipei 101 in 2008 to become the building with the highest occupied floor. Using the criterion of highest tip (including antennae), the World Trade Center in New York City was the world's tallest building from 1972 to 2000, until the Sears Tower in Chicago (which already had a higher occupied floor than the World Trade Center) had its antenna extended to give that building the world's tallest tip a title it held until the 2010 completion of Burj Khalifa. Petronas Towers and Taipei 101 were never the world's tallest buildings by the highest–tip criterion.

See also 

 History of tallest skyscrapers
 List of tallest buildings and structures
 List of Egyptian pyramids
 List of tallest buildings
 List of tallest church buildings
 List of tallest structures built before the 20th century
 List of oldest known surviving buildings

Notes 
A. This significant proportion can be judged as 15% or greater of either the total floor area, or the total building height in terms of number of floors occupied for the function. However, care should be taken in the case of supertall buildings. For example, a 20-story hotel function as part of a 150-story tower does not comply with the 15% rule, though this would clearly constitute mixed use.

References

External links 
 These are the world's tallest structures throughout history, 5 Sep 2019, Visual Capitalist, World Economic Forum
 100 Tallest Completed Buildings in the World, Skyscraper Center
 Buildings database, Structurae.net

Tallest buildings
Tallest Buildings
History of structural engineering
Lists of tallest buildings
Tallest buildings